All the Gold in the World (French: Tout l'or du monde) is a 1961 French-Italian comedy film directed by René Clair and starring Bourvil, Alfred Adam and Philippe Noiret.

It was shot at the Billancourt Studios in Paris. The film's sets were designed by Léon Barsacq.

Cast
Bourvil as Dumont and his sons: Mathieu, 'Toine, Martial
Alfred Adam as Alfred
Philippe Noiret as Victor Hardy
Claude Rich as Fred
 as Stella
Annie Fratellini as Rose
Max Elloy as the country guard  
Jean Marsan as speaker
Pascal Mazzotti as speaker
Albert Michel as Mayor of Cabosse
Michel Modo as Tony
Françoise Dorléac as journalist
Yves Barsacq as photographer
Paul Bisciglia as photographer 
Robert Burnier as magazine's director 
Catherine Langeais as speaker  
René Hell as notary  
Georges Bever   
Christian Marin as television stage manager
 as Léon Truc - guard in prison
Bernard Musson as villager
Paul Préboist as picnicker
Robert Rollis as motorist

References

External links

1961 comedy films
Italian comedy films
French comedy films
Films directed by René Clair
Films shot at Billancourt Studios
1960s French-language films
1960s French films
1960s Italian films